River Arrow Nature Reserve is a local nature reserve located alongside the River Arrow in Alcester, Warwickshire, England. The reserve was set up by Stratford-on-Avon District Council and English Nature to benefit the Alcester community. The creation of the Reserve has allowed the habitat to be preserved and provides an area for local schools to study wildlife.

The Reserve is managed by Stratford-on-Avon District Council, Warwickshire Wildlife Trust (WWT) and the River Arrow Local Nature Reserve steering group. The majority of the work done to maintain the reserve is undertaken by local volunteers with guidance from the WWT.

References

Notes
Information taken with permission from River Arrow Nature Reserve leaflet (produced by WWT).

External links 
 Website set up by Friends of River Arrow Nature Reserve.

Local nature reserves in Warwickshire
Alcester